Blastaar, sometimes called the Living Bomb-Burst and Blasstaar, is a fictional character appearing in American comic books published by Marvel Comics. Blastaar is an opponent of the Fantastic Four and lives in the Negative Zone. He is also an enemy of Annihilus, another Fantastic Four villain.

Publication history

Blastaar first appeared in Fantastic Four #62 (May 1967), and was created by Stan Lee and Jack Kirby.

Fictional character biography
Blastaar is a member of an alien race known as the Baluurians, of the planet Baluur in the Negative Zone (in Sector 56-D, as charted by Reed Richards). He ruled the Baluurians as their monarch ruthlessly until his subjects rebelled and rose against him. Blastaar was deposed as monarch, and became a Negative Zone outlaw. Blastaar was locked up in a special containment suit and set adrift in outer space in the Negative Zone. When he broke loose he sighted Reed Richards, who had been trapped in the Negative Zone as well and followed him and Triton back to Earth. He fought with the Sandman and Reed Richards' group of superheroes, the Fantastic Four but was driven back to the Negative Zone by Mister Fantastic.

Over the following years Blastaar would repeatedly return to Earth to attempt to conquer it and fight the Fantastic Four many times, as well as the Avengers, Thor and other superheroes.

Blastaar went into a coma at one point, but was revived by Professor Paxton Pentecost and became an unwilling servant of Pentecost. Blastaar was forced to battle the Human Torch and the Hulk. He was defeated and imprisoned in adamantium and sunk into the Atlantic Ocean. Blastaar was later freed from his adamantium prison, and battled the Inhumans.

Blastaar later made his first alliance with Annihilus, another conqueror living in the Negative Zone. Blastaar utilized the Super-Adaptoid in an attempt to regain the throne of Baluur. He was opposed by his wife Nyglar, who summoned the Thing and the Avengers to thwart Blastaar and his allies. Blastaar later did regain the throne of Baluur and started to conquer Negative Zone, only opposed by Annihilus. Blastaar led a fleet of warships to conquer Earth, and captured Reed Richards. Blastaar freed Annihilus in an attempt to prevent the Fantastic Four from thwarting his conquest of Earth. Blastaar and Annihilus battled, however. Blastaar was betrayed by his subordinate, Tanjaar, and paralyzed.

Blastaar was later discovered in the Negative Zone by the Eternals. He overthrew the Eternals, but was then defeated by the Avengers and remanded to custody of the Eternals.

Annihilus and Blastaar have teamed up at times, but usually they are fierce enemies. Blastaar's son, Burstaar, has helped his father, but has his own ambitions and allied himself with the Kree.

Annihilation

Blastaar was seen with the Spaceknights, aiding Nova's attempt to assassinate Annihilus.

Blastaar also appeared in the opening pages of Annihilation: Conquest #1.  Blastaar is seen leading a group of Kree soldiers against the Phalanx, but the group is defeated and Blastaar is captured. The Phalanx interrogates Blastaar, and continue to torture him until he apparently dies when he doesn't say a word. This death appears to be simply a hibernation that Blastaar can reverse, which he has used to fool the Phalanx temporarily.

War of Kings

Prior to his appearance in Guardians of the Galaxy #7, Blastaar became king of the Negative Zone. He and his forces seize control of Negative Zone Prison Alpha and recruit a number of the imprisoned Earth superhumans there into his army. Later he is approached by the Raptors Talon and Razor, who offer Blastaar the Cosmic Control Rod they took from Catastrophus, in exchange for his assistance in influencing the outcome of the War between the Shi'ar and the Inhumans. The prison is taken away from Blastaar by super-powered forces of the US Government. The convict Hardball assists in this setback for Blastaar.

Following the climax of the war, Blastaar had an encounter with Nova and his fellow Centurions who were in the process of battling renegade Kree and Shi'ar soldiers. Blastaar wished to capture the soldiers for himself to further assert his own position as ruler over Kree territories. Avoiding a fight, Nova appealed to Blastaar's desire to be seen as a legitimate king and ruler and convinced him to acknowledge the jurisdiction of the Nova Corps.

Thanos Imperative

Blastaar and his forces allied with the consortium of galactic rulers who fought off infection from the Cancerverse. Although he regularly antagonized his more heroic and altruistic allies such as Medusa, the Guardians of the Galaxy and Nova. Eventually, he opted to retreat his forces in an act of self-preservation and no longer aid the heroes.

Annihilators

Blastaar made a bid to become King of the Kree, Shi'ar and Inhumans by staging a coup against Medusa shortly after the depletion and exhaustion of her armies following Thanos Imperative. He beat Medusa but before he could truly claim the throne, his mutiny was thwarted by the arrival of the Annihilators. The new superteam made short work of Blastaar and banished him back to the Negative Zone.

Powers and abilities
Blastaar has superhuman strength and endurance, and is incredibly durable and resistant to injury. Conventional weapons and even ballistic missiles could have no effect on him. His superhuman constitution can withstand extreme variations in temperature and pressure. He is virtually tireless. He can live without nourishment for several weeks and survive in the vacuum of space by inducing himself into a state of hibernation.

He is capable of self-propelled flight at escape velocity. He can project blasts of highly concussive kinetic force from his hands. He can channel the same concussive force to give him flight by propelling himself through the air like a rocket, and can maintain this thrust almost indefinitely. His energy blasts can temporarily disrupt the molecular integrity of the Eternals.

He is also highly trained in the arts of warfare of and by his race and has access to advanced technology from his home world such as starships and powerful plasma-based weapons. Most often, however, he only uses his powers without augmentation.

In other media

Television
 Blastaar appears in Fantastic Four (1967), voiced by Frank Gerstle.
 Blastaar appears in The New Fantastic Four, voiced by Ted Cassidy.
 Blastaar makes a cameo appearance in the Spider-Man and His Amazing Friends episode "Attack of the Arachnoid".
 Blastaar appears in Fantastic Four (1994), voiced by Ron Friedman.
 Blastaar appears in Hulk and the Agents of S.M.A.S.H., voiced by James Arnold Taylor. This version uses special Negative Zone snakes with petrifying venom and is part of the Leader's Agents of C.R.A.S.H.
 Blastaar appears in the Ultimate Spider-Man episode "Contest of Champions", voiced again by James Arnold Taylor. He participates in the Grandmaster's game of "Capture the Flag", but is defeated by Iron Fist and removed from the game.

Video games
 Blastaar appears in Fantastic Four (2005), voiced by Bob Joles. He came to Earth in hopes of conquering it off-screen, but ended up imprisoned and locked in the Vault (a prison for super-beings). He escapes during a power failure in the prison, but is subsequently defeated by Mister Fantastic and the Thing.

Collected editions
The following trade collections contain appearances by Blastaar.

References

External links
 Blastaar at Marvel.com

Comics characters introduced in 1967
Characters created by Jack Kirby
Characters created by Stan Lee
Fictional characters with superhuman durability or invulnerability
Fictional kings
Marvel Comics aliens
Marvel Comics characters with superhuman strength
Marvel Comics extraterrestrial supervillains
Marvel Comics supervillains